Elephantiformes is a suborder within the order Proboscidea that contains the elephants as well as their extinct relatives. Elephant relatives such as the mammoths and the mastodons are included in this designation.

References

 
Mammal suborders